Tumlingtar is a region and a town, in Sankhuwasabha district of Province No. 1 of Eastern Nepal, between the Arun and Sabha rivers. It is located in Sankhuwasabha District. It is also the deepest valley of the world and largest ṭār (butte or mesa) of Nepal.

Demographics
The indigenous tribe of Tumlingtar is Kumal. Their traditional profession is pot-making, though only a few still practise this career nowadays. The other tribes living there are Bahun, Chhetri, Magar, Rai, Tamang, Newar and Majhi. The inhabitants have shown racial harmony. The people of any tribe are always helpful to the rest in the rituals. The total number of families in Tumlingtar is about 600.

Transport
As urbanisation has been growing here, many people of the surrounding areas are drawn to the city nowadays. This is the southernmost point from which the bus regularly goes to the district headquarters. You can reach Tumlingtar by airways or roadways. It will take around 5–6 hours while traveling from some bigger cities like; Biratnagar, Itahari & Dharan. Being located in the Himalayan region, most of the city is offroads, whereas Koshi highway draw a black pitch road from the heart of the city.

Planes regularly fly from Tumlingtar Airport to Biratnagar and Kathmandu. Currently, the airlines operating flights from Tumlingtar are Buddha Air and Yeti Airlines. Tumlingtar is the primary gateway airport for reaching Makalu, the peak being roughly 50 km to the north of the city, with the base camp being accessible by trekking routes.

Local infrastructure
There are some smaller hotels in Tumlingtar, but they generally do not have the facilities required to meet international standards. The city has two schools. The Manakamana Higher Secondary School is the largest public school, with other schools here including Arun Valley English Boarding School & Shree Deu International Boarding School which now collaborate and named as Golden Stars English school. It is the only private school in Tumlingtar. There is also a mart where you can get all your necessities.

Environment
Tumlingtar was once a site of concern of the Nepalese because of the Arun III hydro-electric project. After Arun III established its head office for large 900 MW, this valley has become a centre of attraction for rest of the country. Arun III has the only gateway which is through Tumlingtar.

Religious places
The area is also known for the temple of the Hindu goddess Manakamana, known as Manakamana of Tumlingtar, situated 2.5 km north of the Tumlingtar Airport. Radha-Krishna Temple is also at the middle of Tumlingtar bazar, where people have a lot of faith in, people visit temples especially in cultural and ritual festivals.

References

Tourism in Nepal
Populated places in Sankhuwasabha District